This is a list of mayors and shire presidents of the City of Lake Macquarie and its predecessors in the Hunter Region of New South Wales

The Shire of Lake Macquarie was proclaimed on 6 March 1906. It became a municipality on 1 March 1977 and a city on 7 September 1984.
The Shire was represented by a Shire President and 16 aldermen. When it became a municipality in 1977, the President's title changed to Mayor, but the aldermen's title remained unchanged until the passage of the Local Government Act 1993.

Chairman temporary (1st) council 
 J W. Stenhouse

Shire president (1906–77) 

 S. Croudace – (1906–10)
 J. Talbot – (1910–11) 
 W M. Beath – (1912)
 S. Croudace – (1913–14)
 R. Gormon – (1914–15) 
 W. M. Beath – (1916)
 J. G. Desreaux – (1916–17)
 F. C. Hely – (1917–18)
 J. Johnston – (1918–19) 
 W. M. Beath (1919–20)
 T C. Frith – (1920) 
 J. G. Desreaux – (1920–21) 
 W. M. Beath – (1922–23)
 H. Marks JP (1923–25) 
 J. G. Desreaux – (1926–27) 
 G. Pearce (1928–29) 
 H. S. Richards – (1930–31) 
 J. Johnson – (1931–33)
 G. Pearce – (1933–36)
 C. H. Wilson – (1937–38)
 T. A. Johnson – (April 1938)
 T. I. Johnson JP – (1938–39)
 T. A. Johnson – (1939–40)
 C. H. Wilson – (1940–41)
 J. P. Kenny – (1942–43)
 B. A. Allen – (1943–44) 
 J. P. Kenny – (1945)
 L. P. Gain – (1945)
 R. Chapman (CPA) – (1946–47) 
 J. P. Kenny – (1947–49) 
 L. J. Parsons – (1950)
 C. S. Nichols – (1951–52)
 J. J. Hanlon – (1952) 
 C. Hazell – (1953–55)
 J. Brown – (1955–59)
 T. R. Pendlebury MBE – (1959–68)
 M. L. Hunter MP – (1969)
 W. E. R. Smith – (1969–71)
 W. H. MacDonald – (1971–72) 
 W. E. R. Smith – (1972–74) 
 E. Lenaghan OAM – (1974–75)
 J. A. Edwards – (1975–76)

Mayor of the Municipality (1977–84)  
 Mayor Geoff R. Pasterfield – (1977–84)

Mayor of the city (1984–present)  
 Cr Geoff R. Pasterfield – (1984–1987)
 Cr Ivan Welsh MP – (1987–1991)
 Cr Douglas B. Carley – (1991–1993) 
 Cr John E. Kilpatrick – (1993–2004) 
 Cr Greg Piper MP – (2004–2012)
 Cr Jodie Harrison MP – (2012–2016)
 Cr Kay Fraser - (2016–present)

Notes  
The longest-serving mayor in the city of Lake Macquarie was Cr J E. Kilpatrick, with twelve years as the mayor of Lake Macquarie. J E. Kilpatrick is closely followed by the only mayor to serve as president during the local government's time as a municipality and also to serve as the first mayor of the city of Lake Macquarie, Mr G R. Pasterfield, with eleven years as municipality president and city mayor. The shortest-serving mayor or shire president was M. L. Hunter MP, who resigned as shire president after winning the NSW state electoral division of Lake Macquarie in 1969 after nine months as shire president.

References 

General reference

 

City of Lake Macquarie
Lake Macquarie